was a Marshal Admiral of the Imperial Japanese Navy and one of the leaders of Japan's military during most of the Second World War. In April 1941, he became Chief of the Imperial Japanese Navy General Staff. In this capacity, he served as the navy's commander-in-chief in the Asia-Pacific theater until his removal in February 1944. After the war, he was arrested by the International Military Tribunal for the Far East but died of natural causes in prison during the trial.

Early life and career
Nagano was born in Kōchi to an ex-samurai family.  In 1900, he graduated from the 28th class of the Imperial Japanese Naval Academy, ranking second in a class of 105 cadets. After completing service as a midshipman on the cruiser  and the battleship , he was commissioned an ensign and assigned to the cruiser . During the Russo-Japanese War, he served in a number of staff positions. The closest he came to combat was commanding a land-based heavy naval gun unit during the siege of Port Arthur.

After his promotion to lieutenant in 1905, Nagano served on the battleship . From 1905 to 1906, he studied naval artillery and navigation. From 1906 to 1908, he was chief gunnery officer on the cruiser . In 1909, he graduated from the Japanese Naval War College.

In 1910, Nagano  was promoted to lieutenant commander and assigned as chief gunnery officer on the battleship . From January 1913 to April 1915, he was a language officer in the United States, during which time he studied at Harvard Law School.

During World War I, Nagano was executive officer on the cruisers  and cruiser . In 1918, he was promoted to captain. In 1919, he received his first (and only) ship command, the cruiser .

From December 1920, Nagano was a military attaché to the United States. In this capacity, he attended the Washington Naval Conference.  In November 1923, he returned home, although he returned to the United States on official visits in 1927 and 1933. In December 1923, he was promoted to rear admiral.

Rise to Imperial Navy Leadership

In February 1924, Nagano was chief of the Imperial Japanese Navy General Staff Third Section (Intelligence). From December 1924, he commanded the 3rd Battleship Division. From April 1925, he commanded the 1st China Expeditionary Fleet. In December 1927, he was promoted to vice admiral.

From 1928 to 1929, Nagano was commandant of the Imperial Japanese Naval Academy. Nagano introduced and influenced Progressive education method such as Dalton Plan to Japanese Naval Academy. 

From 1930 to 1931, he was vice chief of the Navy General Staff, in which capacity he attended the Geneva Naval Conference. 
He attended the London Naval Conference 1930. From 1933 to 1934, he was commander in chief of the Yokosuka Naval District.
 
On 1 March 1934, he was promoted to admiral and appointed to the Supreme War Council. Nagano was the chief naval delegate to the London Naval Conference 1935.  Japan withdrew in protest from the 1935 London Conference after it was denied naval parity with the United States and Great Britain.

In 1936, Nagano was appointed Navy Minister under Prime Minister Kōki Hirota. Later in 1937, he became commander-in-chief of the Combined Fleet. By April 1941, he had risen to the very top of the Japanese Navy leadership to become chief of the Imperial Japanese Naval General Staff.

World War II
 
A staunch believer in Nanshin-ron , Admiral Nagano played a central role in Japan's decision to go to war with the United States. After Japanese forces occupied southern Indochina on 24 July 1941, the U.S. and its Western Allies froze Japanese assets within their borders thereby resulting in a halt on all oil shipments to Japan. At the end of the month, Nagano informed Emperor Hirohito that the nation's oil supply would run out in two years if the embargo was not lifted. Consequently, he advised that Japan should be ready for war within that timeframe if attempts at diplomacy failed.

By September 1941, he and the Army's Chief of Staff, General Hajime Sugiyama, called for Japan to be placed on an immediate war-footing and for an end to all negotiations by mid-October.  

According to some Japanese sources, Nagano presented a peace proposal before a conference on November 1, 1941 but this was ultimately struck down by Prime Minister Tojo Hideki..

Viewing it as a needless diversion of Japan's carrier fleet, Nagano initially opposed Admiral Isoroku Yamamoto's planned attack on Pearl Harbor, but reluctantly gave his approval for the attack after Yamamoto threatened to resign as Combined Fleet commander.
In 1943, Nagano was promoted to marshal admiral. By 1944, however, Japan had suffered serious military setbacks and Nagano had lost the confidence of Emperor Hirohito.  With the emperor's approval, Prime Minister Hideki Tōjō and Navy Minister Shigetarō Shimada removed Nagano from his post and replaced him. Nagano spent the remainder of the war as an advisor to the government.

Remark
According to the opinion of the Japanese government, if Japan accepts the demand of the United States, Japan will perish. However, even if Japan fights against the United States, Japan may perish. That is, accepting the request of the United States will destroy Japan without fighting the United States. Even if we fight against the United States, if Japan can not avoid the danger of extinction, if Japan defeats without fighting with the United States, the Japanese people will truly disappear from the earth. However, if Japanese people can fight and show the spirit of defending Japan, even if Japan fights against America, our descendants will always rebuild Japan. We hope to solve problems in diplomatic negotiations. But unfortunately we will be fighting if we are to be commanded to wage war.（September 6, 1941, Osami Nagano）

War crimes trial
After World War II in 1945, the American Occupation forces arrested Nagano. He was charged with Class A war criminal charges before the International Military Tribunal for the Far East in Tokyo. When US naval officers interrogated him, he was described as "thoroughly cooperative," "keenly alert," "intelligent," and "anxious to develop American friendship." He died of a heart attack due to complications arising from pneumonia in Sugamo Prison in Tokyo before the conclusion of his trial.

Naval career

References

Books

External links

Notes

1880 births
1947 deaths
People from Kōchi Prefecture
Harvard Law School alumni
Imperial Japanese Navy marshal admirals
Japanese military personnel of the Russo-Japanese War
Japanese admirals of World War II
Japanese military personnel of World War I
Ministers of the Imperial Japanese Navy
Japanese people who died in prison custody
Recipients of the Order of the Rising Sun
Recipients of the Order of the Sacred Treasure
Recipients of the Order of the Golden Kite
Japanese naval attachés